"East Hastings" is a 1997 song by the Canadian rock band Godspeed You! Black Emperor from the 1998 CD release of their debut album F♯ A♯ ∞ and is perhaps best known for its use in the film 28 Days Later in an edited version.

The song is named after East Hastings Street in Vancouver's Downtown Eastside.

Structure

Nothing's Alrite in Our Life... / The Dead Flag Blues (Reprise)
"East Hastings" begins with a bagpipe reprise of the main theme of the previous track, "The Dead Flag Blues", accompanied by a recording of a street preacher. Both recordings fade out into a soft drone, which begins the next movement.

The Sad Mafioso...
The second section, "The Sad Mafioso..." begins with a slow, repeating guitar theme, slowly building as drums and strings are added. The music becomes faster and more aggressive before switching to double time, ending, and transitioning into the third and final section.

Drugs in Tokyo / Black Helicopter
A pulsating drone starts the final movement, and fades into a guitar loop, before being overtaken by a buzzing, electronic drone, which ends the song.

Use in 28 Days Later
During an interview with The Guardian, 28 Days Later director Danny Boyle explained, "I always try to have a soundtrack in my mind [when creating a film]. Like when we did Trainspotting, it was Underworld. For me, the soundtrack to 28 Days Later was Godspeed. The whole film was cut to Godspeed in my head."

The song does not appear on 28 Days Later: The Soundtrack Album because the rights to the song could not be obtained.

References

Godspeed You! Black Emperor songs
1997 songs